The Sacred Conversation or Madonna and Child Enthroned with praying brothers and devotees, Saint Sebastian, Saint John the Baptist, Saint Mary Magdalene and Saint Roch is a 1490 oil on panel painting by Cima da Conegliano, now in the Pinacoteca di Brera in Milan.

References

1490 paintings
Paintings of the Madonna and Child by Cima da Conegliano
Paintings depicting John the Baptist
Paintings depicting Mary Magdalene
Paintings of Saint Roch
Paintings of Saint Sebastian
Paintings in the collection of the Pinacoteca di Brera